Banhourin Chris Emmanuel Kouakou, known as Chris Kouakou (born 15 December 1999) is an Ivorian football midfielder who plays for Portuguese club Mafra.

Club career
Kouakou signed with FC Midtjylland in Denmark in the summer of 2022

On 11 January 2023, Kouakou signed a three-and-a-half-year contract with Mafra in Liga Portugal 2.

References

1999 births
Living people
Ivorian footballers
Association football midfielders
CS Sfaxien players
FC Midtjylland players
C.D. Mafra players
Tunisian Ligue Professionnelle 1 players
Danish Superliga players
Liga Portugal 2 players
Ivorian expatriate footballers
Expatriate footballers in Tunisia
Ivorian expatriate sportspeople in Tunisia
Expatriate men's footballers in Denmark
Ivorian expatriate sportspeople in Denmark
Expatriate footballers in Portugal
Ivorian expatriate sportspeople in Portugal